Ontario Air National Guard Station is a former California Air National Guard facility located alongside Ontario International Airport in Ontario, California.

Origins in World War II 
Ontario Army Air Field was established before World War II. It is located in San Bernardino County, California, in the city of Ontario. This airport was most known for being the hub for the Los Angeles Basin. Its routes consisted mostly between San Bernardino and Riverside. In 1921, local pilots created club called the Ontario Aircraft corporation to start flying the Jennie Bi-plane aircraft. This same organization classified a landing strip made from just dirt near the corner of Mission Boulevard and Grove Ave, people can see this today at the southwest corner. 

The start of World War II meant that the airport was required for use by the United States Army Air Corps. This however helped the Airport expand by over 845 acres. This airport went from having pure dirt fields to concrete runways, a control tower for air traffic, and high tech landing gear. The cost was covered by the Works Progress Administration. They covered the east and west expansion of 6,200 feet and the northeast/southwest expansion 4,700 feet which was originally planned to last for 39 years. The final cost for two runways in the year 1942 as $350,000.

Units during World War II 
Source:

Establishment in 1949 
In 1949, an Air National Guard training station was established at the former Ontario Army Air Field

In April 1949, the City of Ontario granted a lease for certain airport property to the U.S. Air Force, the site to be used by the California Air National Guard. An armory for the 149th Aircraft Control and Warning Squadron was constructed and later CA ANG activities had a major impact on the airport. In 1952, in response to the desire of the Air National Guard to base fighter aircraft there, the city initiated the first of the three runway extensions. After two additional runway extensions, the airport had a 10,000 foot runway to service both commercial and military traffic.

The 1950s and onwards 
The 1950s saw dynamic growth at Ontario International Airport (the airfield was designated "International" in 1946), with three major aircraft plants, including Lockheed, Douglas and Northrop, having facilities at the airport.

A second runway extension of 1,200 feet was completed in 1956 and permitted the CA ANG's speedy F-86 Sabres to land and take off at Ontario. The first extension (800 ft) came in 1952, and the third (1,800 ft) in 1962, each time to accommodate the faster aircraft being flown by what was by now the 163d Fighter Group of the California Air National Guard. All three runway extensions were funded by the Air National Guard as military construction (MILCON). The 163 FG flew F-86F aircraft from Ontario from 1956 to 1959, and F-86H aircraft from 1959 to 1965. In 1965, the unit transitioned to the F-102 Delta Dagger and in 1968 was renamed the 163d Fighter-Interceptor Group (163 FIG). Operationally-gained by the Aerospace Defense Command (ADC), the 163d continued to fill what was primarily a coastal air defense role for southern California, Nevada and Arizona. In 1975, the unit transitioned to the O-2 Skymaster forward air control aircraft and was re-designated as the 163d Tactical Air Support Group (160 TASG), with operationally claimancy transferred from ADC to Tactical Air Command (TAC).

In 1982, in preparation for transition to the F-4 Phantom II and return to its earlier designation as the 163d Fighter Group, the 163 TASG transferred to March AFB in nearby Riverside. Non-flying CA ANG operations continued at the site with the 148th Combat Communications Squadron until 1997, when Ontario ANGS was closed due to BRAC action and the 148th transferred to the renamed March ARB.

Closure in 1995 
About 40 years ago the Ontario Airport struggled with recurring passengers and cargo services. It had all it needed to be a successful airport such as the infrastructure and  the passenger terminal, however it did not receive the attention it hoped for. It took several years for their luck to turn. Many airports are using the Ontario Airport as a case study for future airports such as Williams Gateway Airport, the former Williams AFB in Arizona.

The Ontario Air National Guard Station closed as a result of the 1995 Base Realignment and Closure Commission.

Over the past 57 years military base closures have taken place though various processes. The Secretary of Defense implemented closures on an ad-hoc basis during 1961 - 1979. Individual service Chiefs and Congress strengthened its veto power for closures during 1980 to 1987. These changes lead to a few major bases being closed and none actually being closed. This being an issue, Congress finally granted authority to an independent Defense Base Closure and Realignment (BRAC) commission to work with the Department of Defense (DoD) to identify bases and installations to the executive and legislative branches for closure or realignment between 1988 and 1995. The BRAC had to responsibility of selecting which bases were to close throughout four rounds of base closures. Even though these BRAC actions represented a large amount of physical reductions in installations and associated units, the DoD continued to request more infrastructure cuts to offset reduced congressional funding for defense. Additional BRAC rounds were requested by the United States Department of Defense (DoD) because there continues to be a significant disparity between support structure capacity versus the number of units and associated military personnel levels. Congress however delayed providing additional BRAC legislation until the fall/winter of 2002.

DoD had reported to congress that billions of dollars could be saved annually if excess base infrastructure could be eliminated .

See also

 California World War II Army Airfields
 36th Flying Training Wing (World War II)

References

External links
 

Installations of the United States Air National Guard
Military installations closed in 1995